Canada women's national floorball team is the national team of Canada. , the team was ranked twelfth by the International Floorball Federation.

References 

Women's national under-19 floorball teams
Floorball